The Zaltair was a fictional computer created by Steve Wozniak. Adam Schoolsky helped him to pull of it at the West Coast Computer Conference. It was a parody of the Altair 8800 computer, which was very popular at the time. Steve Wozniak thought of the name because:The company Zilog had come out with a compatible processor, which they called the Z-80. A few companies using this chip were establishing brands based on Z words. Like ComputerZ or Z-Node or the like.As a joke, Wozniak decided to print a "20,000 brochures" (according to YouTube video "Rare video of Steve Wozniak from 1984 talking about computing, joining Apple and the Mac" filmed at a Cleveland computer club meeting) of a fake product called the 'Zaltair' with a lot of "superlative descriptions of a computer that solved every problem in the world". It advertised, among other things, a new version of the BASIC programming language called "BAZIC", with the ability to "define your own language... a feature we call perZonality".

To help make the ad believable, he included fake trademarks and a shipping label for MITS, the company manufacturing the Altair. Wozniak did not think that this would be an issue, as he had "made sure in advance that MITS would not be at the show." However, it later turned out that a representative from MITS was attending, and had been taking large amounts of their fake brochures.

He also made sure the article had a fake quote from Ed Roberts, then president of MITS, which spelled out the name of a rival company, Processor Technology, when looking at the first letter of every word, further ensuring that the article was not traced back to him.

Steve Jobs 
Steve Jobs, Wozniak's close friend at the time, received a copy of the brochure. He fell for it, and even "took pride that the Apple II stacked up well against the Zaltair in the comparison chart". However, he, like many others, did not realize Wozniak had created the brochure until "Woz gave him a framed copy of the brochure as a birthday gift".

References 

Computer humor
Fictional computers
Practical jokes